The Australasia was a wooden-hulled American Great Lakes freighter that served on the Great Lakes of North America between her construction in 1884 to her burning and sinking in 1896. On October 18, 1896, while loaded with coal, the Australasia sank in Lake Michigan near the town of Sevastopol, Door County, Wisconsin, United States, after burning off Cana Island. On July 3, 2013, the wreck of the Australasia was added to the National Register of Historic Places.

History
The Australasia (Official number 106302) was built in 1884 in West Bay City, Michigan, by the shipyard owned by Captain James Davidson. She was built for the Davidson Steamship Company, which was also owned by Captain Davidson. She was powered by a fore-and-aft compound engine which was fueled by two coal-burning Scotch marine boilers. She had a gross tonnage of 1829.32 tons and a net tonnage of 1539.20 tons.

On September 17, 1884, the Australasia was launched as hull number #9. At the time of her launch, the Australasia was the largest wooden-hulled ship in the world. Because of her enormous size, the Australasia needed iron cross bracing, an iron keelson, iron plates, and several iron arches to increase her strength.

She was used to haul bulk cargoes such as iron ore, coal, grain and sometimes salt. She could carry these cargoes so efficiently that she earned a fortune for her owners at a time when small, less versatile wooden vessels were quickly being replaced by larger, and stronger iron or steel vessels. Just like all ships owned by Captain Davidson, the Australasia used to tow a wooden schooner barge.

Final voyage
On October 17, 1896, the Australasia was bound from a port on Lake Erie for Milwaukee, Wisconsin, carrying 2,200 tons of soft coal. At around 6:00 p.m. near Baileys Harbor, the crew of the Australasia discovered "a fire beneath the texas on the main deck". They attempted to fight the blaze but failed. The crew abandoned the Australasia before she reached Jacksonport, Wisconsin. At 10:30 p.m., the Australasia was about four hours off Jacksonport when the tugboat John Leathem came upon the struggling steamer. The Leathem began towing the Australasia to shore, but the hawser connecting them kept burning through. Her crew decided to scuttle her, by ramming a hole in the Australasia&apos;s side with the Leathem&apos;s stem. She burned until the night of October 18, 1896.

The Australasia today
The Australasia was declared a total loss. Much of her cargo of soft coal and machinery was salvaged; however, her hull was beyond repair and was abandoned. Today her lower hull lies mostly buried in sand 15 to 20 feet of water off Whitefish Dunes State Park. Because most of her hull remains buried in sand, there is the possibility that different hull sections may be uncovered which may reveal more significant information about her construction. Not a trace of her cargo is visible on the site of her wreck, but traces of coal are visible on a beach nearby. The wreck of the Australasia is rarely visited by divers which means that very little site disturbance to the site has occurred. Close by are the wrecks of several other ships, including the early steel freighter Lakeland, the large wooden bulk carrier ''Frank O'Connor, the wooden steamer Louisiana, which was lost during the Great Lakes Storm of 1913, the schooner Christina Nilsson and the steamboat Joys.

References

Notes

Citations

1884 ships
Maritime incidents in 1896
Shipwrecks on the National Register of Historic Places in Wisconsin
National Register of Historic Places in Door County, Wisconsin
Shipwrecks of Lake Michigan
Great Lakes freighters
Steamships of the United States
Merchant ships of the United States
Door County, Wisconsin
Shipwrecks of the Wisconsin coast
Ships sunk with no fatalities
Ships built by James Davidson
Wreck diving sites in the United States